The House of Abdus Salam is a Pakistani national monument. It housed Pakistani Professor Abdus Salam, a theoretical physicist who became the first Muslim and Pakistani to be awarded the Nobel Prize in Physics in 1979.

Location
The monument is located in Jhang, Punjab, Pakistan.

Protection
After the Pakistani 18th Constitutional Amendment, most of the archaeological sites and national monuments were devolved to the provinces. The monuments transferred to the Punjab Archaeology Department included Abdus Salam's house, and funding and conservation initiatives were taken by the archaeology department.

References

Sources

Mausoleums in Punjab, Pakistan
History of Punjab, Pakistan
Monuments and memorials in Punjab, Pakistan
Buildings and structures in Punjab, Pakistan
Abdus Salam